Urtsuniwar or Urchuniwar is a dialect of Kalasha-mun spoken in the Urtsun Valley in Chitral, Khyber Pakhtunkhwa, Pakistan.  The total number of speakers of this dialect are estimated to be around 2,900–5,700 peoples.

Similarity 
It has been debated whether Urtsuniwar is a different language or a dialect of Kalasha-mun. Urtsuniwar and Kalasha are mutually intelligible by 70%.  Urtsuniwar also shares some similarity with Ushojo language.

History 
The Kafirs of Urtsun were one of the last pagans of Afghanistan-Pakistan to convert to Islam in the 1900s.  They renamed their language Kalasha-mun to Urtsuniwar and later borrowed heavily from Khowar and changed their identity.  Later, Urtsuniwar started to diverge into a distinct dialect of Kalasha-mun.

References 

Dardic languages
Languages of Pakistan
Languages of Khyber Pakhtunkhwa